The Bangor Trail is a waymarked walking trail in Erris, North Mayo, Ireland.

Description
It is about 29 kilometres in length. It takes a route south from Bangor Erris through the Nephin Beg Mountain range to Newport and is a fairly tough, remote hiking trail.  The area is largely Atlantic blanket bog terrain although the Atlantic is some distance from the trail.  The Western Way is another walking trail in the same area. There are several other walking trails in Erris, most of them cliff walks along the Benwee Head and Glinsk areas of the North Mayo coastline overlooking Broadhaven Bay.  Walking Maps have been drawn up by Comhar Dún Chaocháin Teo and are available at Carrowteige.

The Bangor Trail follows an old drover path which may date from the Iron Age.  There are, along the route, evidence of previous human habitation, particularly from the mid-19th century just prior to the Irish Famine when population pressure in this area was intense.  In the days (16th century until early 20th century) when English landlords owned vast estates across Ireland, fishing and hunting lodges abounded, especially beside the rivers and lakes, which were used seasonally for red deer and shooting expeditions and the leisure activities of the aristocracy. The landlords would have been responsible for the maintenance of sections of the trail which passed through their lands.  The trail was the main route for people and livestock before roads were built in the area in the first half of the 19th century.

References

External links
 Bangor Trail

Erris
Long-distance trails in the Republic of Ireland
Tourist attractions in County Mayo
Protected areas of County Mayo